Keith Reginald Littler (born 26 March 1961 in Ely, Cambridgeshire) is an English author, writer, composer and producer best known for his work on several children's programmes.

Bottom Knocker Street
Keith Littler, director and founder of Fubuloo Ltd, produced, directed and was lead writer/script editor on 52 X 11mins of Bottom Knocker Street for ITV Southampton (first TX Aug 2013).

The series, based upon an original concept by Paul Galloway and Richard Watson, stars Phill Jupitus and follows the adventures of four children who face random and improbable hurdles in their quest to build a city farm.

Littler also composed and performed the music for the series.

The Little Entertainment Group Ltd.
Littler was also a director of The Little Entertainment Group, which evolved from a post-production company he formed in 1988. Littler’s company produced several internationally successful TV shows including Little Red Tractor, Merlin the Magical Puppy, Little Monsters, Roman Mysteries, and Billy among others.

Littler is a published author of several children’s books relating to his TV series.

In 2007, Littler founded the children’s music group The Bopps and went on to develop and appear in the TV series with Stan Cullimore, Michael Cross and Joanna Ruiz for Nickelodeon.

Littler formed his TV production company in 1988 after ten years of playing in musical bands and football commentating on local radio with Severn Sound.

His passion for motor-sport resulted in him producing and presenting for Sky Sports the Legends Cars Championship.

Other works
Littler has also worked as a sound designer on The Adventures of Dawdle the Donkey (as well as composing the background music) (ITV) and Casper and Friends (TCC), a music composer on Little Monsters (BBC) and a voice director on Watership Down (ITV).
Keith Littler also produces and presents the 'YouTube' internet monthly magazine 'Table Football Monthly' focussing on all types of table football - as highlighted in the title - with 'Subbuteo Table Soccer' the magazine's main focus.

References

External links

The Little Entertainment Group

Living people
1961 births
English television executives
People from Ely, Cambridgeshire
English television writers
British male television writers
English voice directors
English children's writers
English male composers
English television composers